A unilateral declaration of independence (UDI) is a formal process leading to the establishment of a new state by a subnational entity which declares itself independent and sovereign without a formal agreement with the state which it is seceding from. The term was first used when Rhodesia declared independence in 1965 from the United Kingdom (UK) without an agreement with the UK.

Examples

Prominent examples of a unilateral declaration of independence other than Rhodesia's UDI in 1965 include that of the United States in 1776, the Irish Declaration of Independence of 1919 by a revolutionary parliament, Katanga's declaration of independence by Moise Tshombe in July 1960, the attempted secession of Biafra from Nigeria in 1967, the Proclamation of Bangladeshi Independence from Pakistan in 1970, the (internationally unrecognized) secession of the Turkish Republic of Northern Cyprus from Cyprus in 1983, the Palestinian Declaration of Independence from the Palestinian territories in 1988, and that of the Republic of Kosovo in 2008. During the Dissolution of the Soviet Union throughout 1991, many of its republics declared their independence unilaterally without agreement and were thus not recognised as legitimate by the Soviet Central Government.

During the Breakup of Yugoslavia, the government of the United States asked the governments of Croatia and Slovenia to drop their UDI plans because of the threat of major war erupting in the Balkans because of it, and threatened that it would oppose both countries' UDIs on the basis of the Helsinki Final Act if they did so. However, four days later both Slovenia and Croatia announced their UDIs from Yugoslavia.

Legal aspects
The International Court of Justice, in a 2010 advisory opinion, declared that unilateral declarations of independence were not illegal under international law.

See also
 Declaration of independence
 Decolonization
 Helsinki Accords (also known as the Helsinki Final Act)
 International law
 International relations
 List of sovereign states by date of formation
 Secession
 United Nations

References